The No. 2 Construction Battalion, Canadian Expeditionary Force (CEF), was raised in Nova Scotia and was one of two  predominantly Black battalions in Canadian military history and the only Canadian battalion composed of Black soldiers to serve in World War I.  Commanded by Lieutenant Colonel Daniel Hugh Sutherland, formerly of the 193rd Battalion, CEF, all but one of the unit's 19 officers were white, the exception being Captain William A. White, the unit's chaplain.

Historical context

Captain Runchey's Company of Coloured Men was one of the first Black regiments in Canada and served during the War of 1812. Another Black regiment raised in Canada was the Victoria Rifles (Nova Scotia) (1860–61), which was established just after the Crimean War on the eve of the American Civil War. They were led by Captain Anderson, who eventually resigned his command over how poorly the battalion was treated by local military establishment.

With the outbreak of the First World War, Canadians were excited to serve their country and many flocked to recruiting stations from British Columbia to Nova Scotia. This included hundreds of Black Canadians who were also eager and willing to serve. However, at the time few Black people were serving in the Canadian military because of the racial attitudes then prevalent. This time was no different and Black people attempted to enlist in the Canadian Expeditionary Force, but most were rejected and were told that it's a "White man's war." The Department of Militia and Defence's policy towards recruitment was to defer to the judgement of the individual commanding officer, and since many held deeply ingrained beliefs about the inferiority of Black people, very few were accepted.

Members of the Black community petitioned the military for inclusion in the Canadian Expeditionary Force. C.W. Washington, an Edmonton clergyman, offered to raise an all-Black battalion, military officials authorized the creation of the No. 2 Construction Battalion.

Recruitment 
On May 11, 1916, the War Office informed the governor general that it approved of the formation of this unit.  So on July 5, 1916, No. 2 Construction Battalion was authorized.  Its headquarters was initially in Pictou, Nova Scotia, but moved to Truro, Nova Scotia, in September 1916.

The original intention was to recruit the unit primarily from the Maritimes, with companies also being raised in Ontario and Western Canada.  A little over a month after the unit was authorized, however, only 180 recruits had been obtained.  By November 1916, the recruiting situation had improved little, leading Lieutenant Colonel Sutherland to propose raising a company in the British West Indies.  While nothing came of this, the battalion did manage to obtain about 165 men from the United States.  When the men were finally assembled in March 1917 to prepare for departure overseas, the battalion's overall strength was just over 729 men.

Theatre 
The unit departed from Halifax, Nova Scotia, on board the SS Southland on March 28, 1917 and arrived at Liverpool, England, ten days later.

Lacking the numbers to make up a battalion (the smallest unit then deployed by army authorities), the unit was reorganized as No. 2 Construction Company in May 1917, and attached to the Canadian Forestry Corps.  By the fall of 1917, the unit was operating in the Jura Mountains of France, headquartered at La Joux.  It was employed primarily in the production of timber for use by the Allied armies and repairing roads.

The men of No. 2 Construction Battalion returned to Canada in early 1919 and the unit officially disbanded on September 15 of the same year.

Legacy 
In 1981, The Society for the Protection and Preservation of Black Culture in Nova Scotia, which had been incorporated in 1977, chose as its first public event a reunion of Black First World War veterans.  This reunion was held November 12–14, 1982, in Halifax and was attended by nine of the approximately twenty known surviving Black veterans.  They were: William Carter (No. 2), John W. Hamilton (No. 2), Percy J. Richards (No. 2), Gordon C. Wilson (No. 2), Albert D. Deleon (CFC), A. Seymour Tyler (No. 2), Sydney M. Jones (106BN, The RCR), Isaac Phills (85BN), and John R. Pannill (Merchant Navy).

In 1992, the No. 2 Construction Battalion, CEF, was designated an event of national historic significance by the government of Canada, and a commemorative plaque was placed in Pictou, Nova Scotia, the following year.

In February 2007, the Black Cultural Centre for Nova Scotia successively acquired a Victory Medal for a former member of the unit, Sapper PR. P.F. Fenton, by Dave Thomson of St. George, Ontario, for over $7,400 that was being auctioned on eBay.

On June 1, 2022, the battalion was awarded the theatre of war honour "France and Flanders, 1917–18", and the perpetuation of the unit was assigned to the Canadian Military Engineers, with 4 Engineer Support Regiment having the privilege of publicly recognizing the perpetuation.

2002 docudrama Honour Before Glory produced by Anthony Sherwood is based on White's wartime diary, which recorded the hardships faced by the Black soldiers, such as lack of proper clothing and medical care. In July 2022, Prime Minister Justin Trudeau apologized for the "blatant anti-Black hate and systemic racism" endured by the battalion's soldiers.

See also
 Black Canadian
 Portia White (daughter of William A. White)
Military history of Nova Scotia
 Victoria Rifles (Nova Scotia)
 Captain Runchey's Company of Coloured Men
Black Nova Scotians

Notes

References

Further reading
 Black Soldiers in a White Man's War: Race, Good Order and Discipline in a Great War Labour Battalion by Gordon Douglas Pollock, Cambridge Scholars Publishing. 2018.
The Black Battalion (1916-1920): Canada's Best-Kept Military Secret by Calvin W. Ruck
'
Hunt, M.S. Nova Scotia's Part in the Great War The Nova Scotia Veteran Publishing Company Limited. 1920, pp. 148–153
"The Unwelcome Sacrifice: A Black Unit in the Canadian Expeditionary Force, 1917-19", by John G. Armstrong in Ethnic Armies: Polyethnic Armed Forces From the Time of the Habsburgs To the Age of the Superpowers. edited by N. F. Dreisziger

External links
 First World War medal will go to Black Cultural Centre
  Black Veterans - Veterans Affairs Canada
 Nova Scotia Archives - No. 2 Construction Battalion: Nominal Roll

Engineering units and formations of Canada
002
History of Black people in Canada
Military units and formations of Nova Scotia
Black Canadian organizations